Asfendiyarova Gulsum (November 12, 1880, Tashkent – November, 1937, Tashkent) – the first Kazakh woman medical doctor, organizer of the health care system in the Turkestan region, and teacher.

Life and career 
The third daughter of Seitzhafar Asfendiyarov (great-grandson of Aishuak Khan, who ruled in the Younger Horda) and Gulyandam  (maiden surname: Kasymova), who served as a military interpreter under the Turkestan Governor-General, retired in 1916 with the rank of major-General. Gulsum received primary education at home, like her brothers and sisters. In 1890, at the age of ten, she entered the Tashkent women's gymnasium, which she successfully graduated from in 1899.

In 1897, the first Women's Medical Institute in Europe was opened in St. Petersburg, where women could receive higher medical education. Some officials of the Turkestan region hastened to identify their daughters here. However, due to the remoteness of the capital, training was quite expensive and not everyone could afford it.

In 1902, when two professional doctors-graduates of the Institute returned to Turkestan at once, the Council under the Governor-General established 10 scholarships assigned to girls from the Turkestan region who entered this Institute. Along the daughters of Russian officials, in the same year, two Kazakh girls-Zeyneb Abdurakhmanova and Gulsum Asfendiyarova were able to receive a scholarship. After graduating from the Institute in 1908 and returning to work at home, they became the first female doctors among the indigenous inhabitants of the newly created province.

Zeyneb Abdurakhmanova, after working several years, married and left. On the contrary, the fate and career of G. Asfendiyarova are closely connected with Turkestan — and the title of "first" has traditionally been assigned to her.

After graduating from the Institute, Asfendiyarova filed a petition addressed to Emperor Nikolay II:

Having the desire to enter the service of Your Majesty as a doctor in the Turkestan military district, in the village Temirlanovka, Shymkent district of Syr-Darya region, I ask you to accept my petition to identify my service in the Turkestan military district. 

- May 16, 1908 

The petition was dictated, most likely, by the opportunity to see her father in Shymkent. Less than a month later (June 5), it was granted, and she was officially accepted for the requested position.

Probably, the sanitary post in Tamerlanovka served an area of 24 km2 with a population of about eight thousand people. In addition to the salary, the district physician received compensation for "dining", "interpreter", "travel" and " other expenses "-a total of 2,680 rubles per year; annually relied 10 — day leave, and once every four years-four months leave and an increase in salary" for seniority " by about 10 %.

In 1910, Asfendiyarova transferred to work in the Papal rural medical district of Namangan County, where working conditions were slightly easier.

On the eve 1912 year father conveyed Gulsum proposal Khiva vizier begin to work in under construction Khiva urban hospital. Gulsum agreed on the condition that her salary and pension guarantees due would not be less than the current ones for the Russian medical service. In 1913, she began her duties as an obstetrician-assistant to the chief physician in Khiva. Here, for the first time in the history of this Asian region, she performed a Caesarean section. In a month the small Khiva city hospital accepted 3-4 thousand people.

In 1914, with the beginning of turbulent times, G. Asfendiyarova returned to Tashkent. Here, with the help of her father, she opened a private hospital with 30 beds. Gradually, her socially active father-most likely a supporter of Patriotic and social "movements" in Turkestan-introduced her to his activities. In the era of the February and October revolutions, the position of the head of one of the city maternity hospitals, as, undoubtedly, the personal position and reputation of G. D. Asfendiyarova, served as the basis for her nomination in 1918 as a delegate to the all-Russian Congress of Muslim women in Kazan at which she was elected a member of the Organizing Bureau.

Returning to Tashkent, G. Asfendiarova remains the Director of the city maternity hospital; actively participates in the political life of the then all-Turkic capital; helps his brother — also a physician, the future Minister of health of KazASSR, Sanjar Asfendiarov-in his work on the organization of assistance to the hungry and homeless.

In 1920, on behalf and with the support of the Muslim Bureau, headed by the people's Commissar of health of the TASSR T. Ryskulov, G. Asfandiarova organizes "women's obstetric courses", where she personally conducted the course "Physiology of pregnant women". Later, the courses were reassigned to Tashkent medical College named after Yu Ahunbababeva, but she continued to teach here until her death.

Since 1922, Asfendiyarova combines teaching with work in the Children's city hospital, where her assistant was A. Doszhanova - the first graduate of the East Asian University which opened in Tashkent, majoring in doctor (autumn 1922). Asfendiyarova had known Dosjanova  in the Organizational Bureau of the Muslim women of Russia in Kazan. — So, in that way the race of women of the East for equal rights in the sphere of professions continued.

In the 1920s, G. D. Asfendiyarova was repeatedly elected a member of the city Council, spoke in the press on the improvement of the social sphere, the protection of motherhood and childhood.

The later life of the G. D. Asfendiyarova is almost unknown. During the repressions of the 1930s, Gulsum's brother, Sanjar, was shot, and his wife and daughter were arrested and exiled to Siberia. The life of Gulsum, daughter of the Tsar's major-General, sister of the "enemy of the people" hung in the balance. According to some reports, avoiding the bitter fate of the "unreliable", G. Asfendiyarova survived the Terror and died a natural death in Tashkent in 1941. The place of her burial is unknown.

References

This article is translated from the corresponding article in the Russian Wikipedia, :ru:Асфендиарова, Гульсум Джафаровна   

1880 births
1937 deaths
Turkestan
Kazakhstani women scientists
Physicians from Tashkent
Kazakhstani physicians
Soviet women physicians